The Ven John Jenkin Jones  was Archdeacon of St Asaph from 1974 to 1984.

He was born in 1905 and educated at University College, Durham, and ordained in 1941. He began his career with curacies at Denbigh, Colwyn Bay and Northop.  He held incumbencies at St Martin Eglwysbach, St James, Holywell and St Eleri, Llanrhos.  He was Rural Dean of Holywell from 1969 to 1974 when he became archdeacon of the surrounding area. He retired in 1978; and died in 1996.

Notes

1905 births
Alumni of University College, Durham
20th-century Welsh Anglican priests
Archdeacons of St Asaph
1996 deaths